Ma'ale Tzviya (lit. Zvia Heights), also Tzviya, is a community settlement in northern Israel. Located in the Galilee to the south-east of Karmiel, it falls under the jurisdiction of Misgav Regional Council.

History
The village was established in 1979 as a kibbutz, and was named after Zivia Lubetkin, one of the leaders of the Jewish underground in Nazi-occupied Warsaw. The kibbutz was closed in 1986 and the site taken over by members of the "Atid" (lit. Future) gar'in, who founded a community settlement with the assistance of the Jewish Agency.

The founders defined the settlement as "a Jewish Israeli settlement according to the way of Emin".

References

External links
Ma'ale Tzviya Galilee Development Authority 

Community settlements
Former kibbutzim
Populated places established in 1979
Populated places in Northern District (Israel)
1979 establishments in Israel